Richeval is a commune in the Moselle department in Grand Est in north-eastern France. It is situated in the historical region Lorraine, at 62 km from Strasbourg, the nearest city.

See also
 Communes of the Moselle department

References

External links
 

Communes of Moselle (department)